Robert 'Bob' Milne is an American ragtime musician and concert pianist. Considered as a "very good specialist of ragtime boogie", he was referred to as a "national treasure" after he was interviewed and documented for future generations by the U.S. Library of Congress in 2004.

Experiments conducted by Penn State neuroscientist Kerstin Bettermann established that Milne has the unusual ability to mentally "play" up to 4 symphonies in his head simultaneously.

Discography

 Folksongs, Barrelhouse and Ragtime (1993)
 Old Songs & Old Rags - Some Like 'Em Hot! (1997)
 The Robert E. Lee (1997)
 The Green River Blues (2000)
 Boogie, Blues & Rags (2001)
 The Red River Valley (2004)
 I wonder (2007)
 Silent Night (Ragged Night) (2007)
 Sounds of New Orleans (2007)
 The Last Carousel (2014)
 The Midnight Express

References

Further reading
 "Neuroscientist studies Lapeer musical genius' 'impossible' skill to help stroke victims". Flint Journal.
 "The mind of Bob Milne: Unique brain stimuli subject of medical study". The County Press.
 "Bob Milne: Four Songs, One Mind. Scientific American.
 "Bob Milne Comes To Conference Center". Fairfield Bay News.
 "Acclaimed ragtime pianist Bob Milne to perform at the Howmet Playhouse". Mlive.com.
 "Ragtime and boogie woogie piano master Bob Milne returns". Boothbay Register.
 "Ragtime star Bob Milne to perform at Grand Ledge Opera House". Lansing State Journal.
 "Renowned ragtime pianist and "four-track mind" Bob Milne to visit campus". Sewanee Today.

External links
www.bobmilne.com

Ragtime composers
American ragtime musicians
Ragtime pianists
Living people
Year of birth missing (living people)
21st-century pianists